Ethalia omphalotropis is a species of sea snail, a marine gastropod mollusk in the family Trochidae, the top snails.

Description
The small, semi-transparent shell has an ovate-discoidal shape. Its colour is white and  entirely devoid of coloured markings. The 3½ convex whorls increase rapidly in size with deeply marked sutures. The body whorl has a spherical periphery. This species has a peculiar sharp keel surrounding the umbilicus. The aperture has an almost circular shape.

Distribution
This marine species occurs off Japan.

References

 Higo, S., Callomon, P. & Goto, Y. (1999) Catalogue and Bibliography of the Marine Shell-Bearing Mollusca of Japan. Elle Scientific Publications, Yao, Japan, 749 pp.

External links
 To World Register of Marine Species

omphalotropis
Gastropods described in 1863